Regulatory Toxicology and Pharmacology is a monthly peer-reviewed scientific journal which covers legal aspects of toxicological and pharmacological regulations. It is published by Elsevier on behalf of the International Society of Regulatory Toxicology & Pharmacology. The current co-editors-in-chief are Lesa L. Aylward and Martin van den Berg.

Conflicts of interest 

In 2002, a group of 45 academics wrote a letter accusing the journal of a concealed pro-industry bias, a possible lack of full and independent peer review, and a failure to disclose conflicts of interest, citing a case in which Gio Batta Gori, then-current editor-in-chief, was paid $30,000 by the Tobacco Institute to write an article later published in the journal dismissing the health risks of secondhand smoke. The letter's coordinator later commented that the journal "reads like an industry trade publication, but it's masked as a peer-reviewed journal" and that it lacked any "credible peer-review process." In response, the journal's publisher implemented a conflict of interest disclosure policy at the journal in January 2003, shortly before the correspondence was published.

Abstracting and indexing 
The journal is abstracted and indexed in EMBASE, EMBiology, and Scopus.

According to the Journal Citation Reports, the journal has a 2014 impact factor of 2.031, ranking it 56th out of 87 journals in the category "Toxicology" and 146th out of 254 journals in the category "Pharmacology & pharmacy".

References

External links
 

Monthly journals
Toxicology journals
Pharmacology journals
English-language journals
Elsevier academic journals
Publications established in 1981
Academic journals associated with international learned and professional societies